Heimir Hallgrímsson (born 10 June 1967) is an Icelandic former football player, dentist, and current manager of the Jamaica national football team.

Career
As a player Heimir started playing for ÍBV from his local town Vestmannaeyjar in 1986. He played with them until 1996 except for the 1993 season in which he played for Höttur while managing their women's team. From 1996 until 2007 he played lower league football with another club from Vestmannaeyjar, from 1996 to 1997 he played with Smástund and from 1998 with KFS, the merged team of Smástund and another lower league team from Vestmannaeyjar called Framherjar. From 2002 to 2007 his appearances were sporadic. Throughout his playing career, he also served as the dentist for his home village, and even after taking sole reign over the Icelandic national team after Euro 2016.

In the summer of 2016, he cared for a player who had a tooth knocked out at a local women's game he was attending, going on the pitch while the player was knocked unconscious and putting the tooth back in place, and then personally making the necessary tooth repair at a nearby dental office.

Coaching career

Club
In 1993, while playing with the men's senior team of Höttur, he coached their women's team, helping the team come first in the second tier and achieve promotion. Alongside working as a dentist in Vestmannaeyjar he started coaching the town's women's senior team, ÍBV, guiding them towards the top of the Icelandic women's Premier league, gaining places in the table each year. In 2002, he was hired as assistant coach for the men's team of ÍBV, being their coach for the last games of the season after the coach was fired. In 2003, he again took over the women's team, guiding them to two 2nd-place finishes in the league and two cup finals, with ÍBV winning the second one in 2004. He then didn't coached any club in 2005 but again took over as the coach for the ÍBV men team mid-season in 2006, coached the team in the last 6 matches but failing to prevent relegation. He remained this time as coach and got promoted with the team in the 2008 season, finishing 10th out of 12 in the top division in 2009 before managing two 3rd-place finishes in a row in 2010 and 2011.

Iceland
On 14 October 2011, KSÍ announced they had appointed Heimir as assistant coach of the Iceland national football team alongside Lars Lagerbäck as coach. Iceland qualified for the play-off stage of the 2014 FIFA World Cup qualification, however, Iceland lost there against Croatia. Shortly thereafter Heimir and Lagerbäck signed a new contract, this time as joint coaches. Heimir became the sole coach following Euro 2016, with Lagerbäck becoming coach of Norway. Heimir resigned as coach of the team on 17 July 2018 after the team's failure to progress beyond the group stage 2018 FIFA World Cup, which was the team's maiden World Cup campaign.

Al-Arabi
On 10 December 2018 Heimir was hired as Head Coach for the Qatar Stars League club Al-Arabi. His contract was for  years or until summer of 2021.

Jamaica
In September 2022, the Jamaican Football Federation announced Hallgrímsson as the new coach of the Jamaican national team.

References

External links

 

Hallgrimsson, Heimir
Hallgrimsson, Heimir
Icelandic dentists
Icelandic footballers
Icelandic football managers
Iceland national football team managers
Al-Arabi SC (Qatar) managers
People from Vestmannaeyjar
Hallgrimsson, Heimir
Íþróttabandalag Vestmannaeyja managers
Íþróttabandalag Vestmannaeyja players
Úrvalsdeild karla (football) players
Úrvalsdeild karla (football) managers
2018 FIFA World Cup managers
Association football defenders
Íþróttafélagið Höttur players
Expatriate football managers in Qatar
Icelandic expatriate sportspeople in Qatar
Icelandic expatriate football managers
Jamaica national football team managers